The 2010–11 FA Trophy is the 41st season of the FA Trophy, the Football Association's cup competition for teams at levels 5–8 of the English football league system. A total of 266 clubs have entered the competition. This was reduced to 265 when Ilkeston Town withdrew after the club was wound up.

Calendar

Preliminary round
Ties will be played on 2 October 2010.

Ties

Replays

† – After extra time

First round qualifying
Ties will be played on 16 October 2010.

Teams from Premier Division of Southern League, Northern Premier League and Isthmian League entered in this round.

Ties

Replays

† – After extra time

Second round qualifying
Ties will be played on 30 October 2010.

Ties

Replays

† – After extra time

Third round qualifying
Ties will be played on 20 November 2010

This round is the first in which Conference North and South teams join the competition. After Ilkeston Town folded, Redditch United received a bye to the first round.

Ties

Replays

First round 
Ties will be played on 11 December 2010

This round is the first in which Conference Premier teams join those from lower reaches of the National League System.

The Curzon Ashton vs. Altrincham match on 11 December 2010 was abandoned at half time due to a power failure with the score 2–1 in favour of Curzon Ashton. The re-scheduled game on 14 December 2010 finished 2–0 to Altrincham.

Ties

Replays

† – After extra time

Second round 
Ties will be played on 15 January 2011

Ties

Replays

† – After extra time

Third round 
Ties will be played on 5 February 2011

Ties

Replays

† – After extra time

Quarter finals
Ties will be played on 26 February 2011

Ties

Replay

† – After extra time

Semi-finals

First leg

Second leg

Mansfield Town win 2–1 on aggregate

Darlington win 3–2 on aggregate

Final

References

General
 Football Club History Database: FA Trophy 2010-11

Specific

2010–11 domestic association football cups
League
2010-11